The Most Dangerous Game is a 1924 short story by Richard Connell.  The Most Dangerous Game or Most Dangerous Game may also refer to:

 The Most Dangerous Game (1932 film), a Pre-Code film adaptation of the short story
 The Most Dangerous Game (2022 film), a remake of the 1932 film
 The Most Dangerous Game (novel), a 1964 novel by Gavin Lyall, unrelated to the short story
 Most Dangerous Game, a 2020 streaming action series adaptation of the short story

See also 
 A Dangerous Game (disambiguation)
 Dangerous Game (disambiguation)
 Most dangerous sports, sport activities perceived as involving a high degree of risk